Aspropyrgos Railway Station is a train station in the municipality of Aspropyrgos, West Attica, Greece. The station is located north of the residential area, on the Athens Airport–Patras railway. It is located adjacent to the Thriasian Plain freight yard owned by OSE.

History
It opened on 18 July 2006 and should not be confused with the older station on the Piraeus–Patras railway that is located further south, inside the town of Aspropyrgos. In 2008, all Athens Suburban Railway services were transferred from OSE to TrainOSE. In 2009, with the Greek debt crisis unfolding OSE's Management was forced to reduce services across the network. Timetables were cutback and routes closed, as the government-run entity attempted to reduce overheads. In 2017 OSE's passenger transport sector was privatised as TrainOSE, currently, a wholly-owned subsidiary of Ferrovie dello Stato Italiane infrastructure, including stations, remained under the control of OSE. In August 2021, a train (train 1329 Kiato to Piraeus) on approach to the station was attacked by stones, damaging the driver's cab. In July 2022, the station began being served by Hellenic Train, the rebranded TranOSE.

Facilities
The ground-level station is located via stairs or a ramp. It has 2 island platforms, with the main station buildings located on the westbound platform. As of (2021) the station has waiting shelters on the platforms and staffed booking office. There is no cafe or shop on-site. At platform level, there are sheltered seating, Dot-matrix display departure or arrival screens and timetable poster boards on all the platforms. There are lifts and stairs to both raised Island platform's. The station is equipped with a large car park and bus stop on the forecourt at the entrance to the station, where the local 855, 881 call.

It is adjacent to the Thriasian Plain freight yard owned by OSE.

Services

Since 15 May 2022, the following weekday services call at this station:

Station layout

See also
Railway stations in Greece
Hellenic Railways Organization
Hellenic Train
Proastiakos

References

West Athens (regional unit)
Buildings and structures in West Attica
Transport in West Attica
Railway stations in Attica
Railway stations opened in 2006